{{DISPLAYTITLE:C48H28O30}}
The molecular formula C48H28O30 (molar mass: 1084.71 g/mol, exact mass: 1084.06654 u) may refer to:
 (α/β-)Punicalagin, an ellagitannin
 Punicacortein C, an ellagitannin
 Punicacortein D, an ellagitannin
 Terchebulin, an ellagitannin
 Isoterchebulin, an ellagitannin

Molecular formulas